Armen Garikovich Ambartsumyan (born 11 April 1994) is an Armenian-Russian football player who currently plays for Ararat-Armenia.

Career

Club
Ambartsumyan made his professional debut in the Russian Professional Football League for FC Zenit Penza on 25 July 2014 in a game against FC Podolye Podolsky district.

He made his Russian Football National League debut for FC Torpedo Armavir on 12 July 2015 in a game against FC Zenit-2 Saint Petersburg.

On 23 June 2016, Ambartsumyan left CSKA Moscow to sign for Mordovia Saransk.

International
After representing Russia throughout junior levels, Ambartsumyan was called up to the senior Armenia national football team in 2017.

Career statistics

Club

Honours

Club 
Ararat-Armenia
 Armenian Premier League (2): 2018–19, 2019–20
 Armenian Supercup (1): 2019

References

External links
 
 

1994 births
Living people
Sportspeople from Saratov
Armenian footballers
Russian footballers
Russia youth international footballers
Russia under-21 international footballers
PFC CSKA Moscow players
Russian sportspeople of Armenian descent
FC Armavir players
FC Mordovia Saransk players
FC Fakel Voronezh players
FC Ararat-Armenia players
Armenian Premier League players
Association football midfielders